John Watts (or  Kunokeski ), also known as Young Tassel, was one of the leaders of the Chickamauga Cherokee (or "Lower Cherokee") during the Cherokee-American wars. Watts became particularly active in the fighting after frontiersmen murdered his uncle, Old Tassel Carpenter 1708-1788, in 1788, while he traveled with Cherokee delegates to a peace conference.

Family life
John Watts 1746-1808 was the "mixed-blood", or mixed-race son of British trader John Watts 1704-1779 and a Cherokee mother, Oousta White Owl Carpenter 1722-1768. The senior Watts, father of Young Tassell, served as the official British government Indian interpreter for the area until his death in 1779. Watts's mother, Oousta, was a sister of Cherokee chiefs Attakullkulla Carpenter 1702-1777 and Old Tassel - Great Eagle Carpenter 1702-1777, father to Chief DoubleHead, Hanging Maw and Pumpkin Boy, . The young Watts was raised in Cherokee culture. Watts' parents resided in the Overhill Towns along the Little Tennessee River. Elizabeth Wurteh "Betsy” Watts was the mother of Chief John Jolly, Chief Robert Benge, Tahlonteeskee, Bloody Fellow, James Benge and Sequoyah.  Their brother John Watts Bowles 1756-1839 was Chief of the Arkansas Cherokee, leading a contingency of Chickamauga west of the Mississippi into Spanish Territory present day St. Francis River, Parkin, Arkansas in 1794.  A passport was required from Spanish Governor in Mexico City.   Young Tassell married and had children with Mary Johnson (children John and Margaret Watts documented, others possible); Wurteagua Carpenter (Mink, John, Soup and Fish Tail, possible others); Oousta White Owl Hanging Maw (Thomas Rattling Gourd Watts, Two Wood, PeachEater, Elizabeth, Jacob Oostooli Z Watts, Councilor John J); and Tsiyugi (Rachel, John and Mary Polly) - each of these have been documented.

Separation from the Overhill Towns
Although Watts withdrew from the Overhill Towns along with Dragging Canoe's band, at first he was minimally involved in the raiding they made against American settlers during and after the Revolutionary War. Watts moved with the band downriver to Running Water Town, still in Tennessee but further from the frontier. Later they moved to Willstown, in what is now Alabama.

Warrior
Watts led his first major action of the Cherokee-American wars in 1786 against the forces of the State of Franklin over their incursions into the territory of the Overhill Cherokee. Warriors from the Valley Towns in North Carolina also joined in the attacks.

In October 1788, following the murder of his uncle Old Tassel by frontiersmen, Watts led a large war party into North Carolina's Washington District (now Tennessee).  The band included the young man The Ridge (known as Nunnehidihi, or Ganundalegi) going into his first battle. They captured and burned Gillespie's Station, killing its defenders and taking several prisoners. The Cherokee warriors proceeded against White's Fort (modern day Knoxville, Tennessee), where they were repulsed. Afterward, the group made a semi-permanent camp along Flint Creek (in the area of the future Unicoi County, Tennessee), harassing, raiding, and attacking white settlers in the surrounding countryside. Watts was one of the leaders of the Indian confederacy that failed in their 1792 attack of Buchanan's Station, though he was badly wounded and barely survived.

Watts signed the 1791 Treaty of Holston, along with fellow war leaders: Doublehead, Bloody Fellow, Black Fox (a future chief of the Cherokee Nation), The Badger (Dragging Canoe's brother), and Rising Fawn.

War chief of the Lower Cherokee 
In 1792, Dragging Canoe died suddenly on March 1, 1792, but he had earlier said he wanted Watts to succeed him. Watts, was then living again in the Overhill area. He became war council head, or "skiagusta," of the Lower Cherokee.

First actions
Watts, along with Bloody Fellow, Doublehead, and "Young Dragging Canoe" (Tsula), continued to encourage Indian unity in resistance to European-American settlers. He honored the agreement with McGillivray, of the Upper Muscogee, to build blockhouses (from which warriors of both tribes could operate) at Running Water, Muscle Shoals, and at the junction of the Tennessee and Clinch rivers in Alabama. 

Watts also traveled to Pensacola to conclude a treaty with the Spanish governor of West Florida, Arturo O'Neill. Under that treaty, the Spanish would provide arms and supplies to the Native Americans to carry on their war against the US. At about this time, Watts moved his base of operations to Willstown (Cherokee town), in what is now Alabama. This put the Cherokee closer to their Muscogee allies while shielding them from the westward expansion of the new United States.

In September 1792, Watts assembled a large gathering of Cherokee and Muscogee warriors (which  included some cavalry). He planned to lead a campaign into the Cumberland region of Appalachia. It was to be a three-pronged attack: Tahlonteeskee (aka Ataluntiski) would lead a force to ambush the Kentucky road; Middle Striker would take the Walton road; and Watts would lead the main army of 280 Cherokee, Shawnee, and Muscogee warriors against Nashville (it was then the capital of the Miro District of the new Southwest Territory). 

On the way to Nashville, the army encountered and attacked a settlement known as Buchanan's Station but suffered serious casualties. Watts was seriously wounded, and Siksika (known as "The Shawnee Warrior," and an older brother of Tecumseh)); Tahlonteeskee (also called Talotiskee of the Broken Arrow, a Muscogee warrior); Little Owl (a brother of Dragging Canoe); and Pumpkin Boy (a brother of Doublehead), all died in the encounter.

Last campaign

Later in 1793, Watts sent envoys to Knoxville, which was at the time the capital of the Southwest Territory, to meet with Governor Blount to discuss terms for a lasting peace. The peace party included Bob McLemore, Tahlonteeskee, Captain Charley of Running Water, and Doublehead, as well as the white delegates. Along the way, the group was attacked by a militant group of frontiersmen during a stop at the Overhill town of Coyatee. Hanging Maw was wounded, while his wife and daughter (along with several other Indians and one of the white delegates), were killed. The Cherokee people, along with Watts' Chickmauga warriors, agreed to await the outcome of the subsequent trial. In large part because the man responsible (who had lost his family in an Indian raid) was a close friend of John Sevier, the trial proved to be a farce.

Watts responded by invading the Holston area with more than 1,000 Cherokee, Muscogee, and Shawnee warriors, one of the largest Indian forces seen in the region.  He intended to attack Knoxville. On the way, the Cherokee leaders were discussing among themselves whether to kill all the residents of the settlement, or just the men. Doublehead argued for the former, while James Vann advocated the latter.

On the way to Knoxville, the war party encountered the small settlement of Cavett's Station. After they had surrounded the place, Bob Benge negotiated with the inhabitants, agreeing that if they surrendered, their lives would be spared.  However, after the settlers had walked out, Doublehead's group and his Muscogee allies attacked and killed them.  Vann grabbed one small boy and pulled him onto his saddle, but Doublehead killed the boy with an axe. Watts intervened and saved another young boy, handing him to Vann, who put the boy behind him on his horse and later handed him over to three of the Muscogee for safe-keeping. One of the Muscogee killed and scalped the boy a few days later.

Final peace 
With the defeat of the Western Confederacy at the Battle of Fallen Timbers by the United States, and the destruction of Nickajack Town and Running Water Town in September 1794, the leaders of the Lower Cherokee became convinced that continuing the war was futile. The council signed the Treaty of Tellico Blockhouse in November, officially ending hostilities with the US.

Although the Cherokee elected a "national" government in 1794, complete with a Principal Chief and National Council, it had no real power. The individual regional councils for each of the major Cherokee geographic divisions still dominated decisions in their relative areas. Watts spurned any "national office." He served as a chief of the Lower Cherokee until his death in 1802. He was succeeded by Doublehead.

References

Sources
American State Papers, Indian Affairs, Vol. 1, 1789-1813, Congress of the United States, Washington, DC, 1831-1861.
Brown, John P.  Old Frontiers: The Story of the Cherokee Indians from Earliest Times to the Date of Their Removal to the West, 1838.  (Kingsport: Southern Publishers, 1938).
Evans, E. Raymond.  "Notable Persons in Cherokee History: Bob Benge". Journal of Cherokee Studies, Vol. 1, No. 2, pp. 98–106.  (Cherokee: Museum of the Cherokee Indian, 1976).
Evans, E. Raymond.  "Notable Persons in Cherokee History: Dragging Canoe". Journal of Cherokee Studies, Vol. 2, No. 2, pp. 176–189.  (Cherokee: Museum of the Cherokee Indian, 1977).
Haywood, W.H.  The Civil and Political History of the State of Tennessee from its Earliest Settlement up to the Year 1796.  (Nashville: Methodist Episcopal Publishing House, 1891).
Klink, Karl, and James Talman, ed.  The Journal of Major John Norton.  (Toronto: Champlain Society, 1970).
McLoughlin, William G. Cherokee Renascence in the New Republic. (Princeton: Princeton University Press, 1992).
Mooney, James. Myths of the Cherokee and Sacred Formulas of the Cherokee. (Nashville: Charles and Randy Elder-Booksellers, 1982).
Moore, John Trotwood and Austin P. Foster. Tennessee, The Volunteer State, 1769–1923, Vol. 1. (Chicago: S. J. Clarke Publishing Co., 1923).
Ramsey, James Gettys McGregor.  The Annals of Tennessee to the End of the Eighteenth Century.  (Chattanooga: Judge David Campbell, 1926).
Cruse Hardion, Freda.  Birth of the Ozarks 1794-1839 Trail of Tears. 

1802 deaths
18th-century Cherokee people
Chickamauga Cherokee
Native American leaders
Year of birth unknown
18th-century Native Americans
Cherokee Nation people (1794–1907)